Chase Brothers Motorcycle was a British motorcycle maker.

Origins
Arthur Chase was a professional bicycle racer, his brother F. W. Chase a former works rider for BAT in 1902.

In 1903, the brothers co-founded a motorcycle company, relying on their racing reputation and F.W.'s well-known tuning skills. It was powered by a  Soncin engine.

The company folded in 1906.

No examples are known to survive.

Notes 

Defunct motorcycle manufacturers of the United Kingdom
Vehicle manufacturing companies established in 1903
1903 establishments in England
British brands
Defunct motor vehicle manufacturers of England
Companies based in Hertfordshire
Motorcycles of the United Kingdom
1906 disestablishments in England
British companies disestablished in 1906
British companies established in 1903